Rede Brasil de Televisão (Brazil Television Network, also known as Rede Brasil or RBTV) is a Brazilian television network headquartered in the city of Campo Grande, Mato Grosso do Sul. The network first aired in April 2007 and has its studios in the city of São Paulo, São Paulo. Its network is administered by Marcos Tolentino da Silva.

History 
Aired on April 7, 2007. Since its foundation, RBTV has a growing number of Brazilian municipalities receiving its signal, with 512 municipalities having the option to watch RBTV.

Rede Brazil is a television station that has a wide variety of segments on its programming.

RBPlay 
In November 2022, Rede Brasil launched RBPLAY, a free streaming application, containing all of the broadcaster's programming.

References

External links
Official site

Television networks in Brazil
Portuguese-language television networks
Television channels and stations established in 2007
Television channels and stations disestablished in 2021